Pavel Pavlovich Solomin (born 15 June 1982) is an Uzbekistani footballer. Currently he plays for Persitara as a striker.

Career
After scoring 21 goals in the Uzbek League he tried in a better league like the Russian Premier League, but strangely he only played 6 minutes with his team FC Saturn Moscow Oblast in the whole competition.

He signed with Indonesian side Sriwijaya on 21 February 2010. He scored his first goal in Indonesia against Bontang FC. He scored the winning goal of SFC against Arema Malang in the Piala Indonesia final.

In winter 2011-12 he was on trial in Lokomotiv Tashkent, but started 2012 season in the club Travmaychi Tashkent, in Uzbekistan Second League, championship of Tashkent.

In August 2012 he signed a contract with Mash'al. In February 2012 he moved to Shurtan Guzar.

International
Solomin has made 15 appearances for the Uzbekistan national football team, scoring twice.

Career statistics

International
Goals for Senior National team'

Honours

Individual
Uzbek League Top Scorer: 2006 (21 goals)

References

External links

1982 births
Living people
Sportspeople from Tashkent
Uzbekistani people of Russian descent
Uzbekistani footballers
Uzbekistani expatriate footballers
Uzbekistan international footballers
FC Saturn Ramenskoye players
Pakhtakor Tashkent FK players
Navbahor Namangan players
Liga 1 (Indonesia) players
Sriwijaya F.C. players
Persisam Putra Samarinda players
Expatriate footballers in Indonesia
Expatriate footballers in Russia
Uzbekistani expatriate sportspeople in Russia
Uzbekistani expatriate sportspeople in Indonesia
Russian Premier League players
2007 AFC Asian Cup players
Association football forwards